The 1965 Samar division plebiscite was a plebiscite on the division of the province of Samar into the provinces of Eastern Samar, Northern Samar and Western Samar in accordance with Republic Act No. 4221 that was passed on June 19, 1965. The plebiscite was held on November 9, 1965, and the results were announced on February 15, 1966.

Results 
From a total of 151,261 votes that were cast in the plebiscite, 135,259 votes or 89 percent of the total votes cast were for the division of the province of Samar into the provinces of Eastern Samar, Northern Samar and Western Samar.

The provisions of Republic Act No. 4221 went into effect following the election of the first officials of the new provinces on November 14, 1967.

References 

1965 referendums
1965 in the Philippines
Provincial plebiscites in the Philippines
Administrative division referendums